The YGL motif (or the amino acids in sequence of Tyrosine-Glycine-Leucine) is an integrin-binding motif present in several viral glycoproteins including Equine Herpes Virus (EHV) 1, EHV-4, and in rotavirus VP4.

References

Protein structural motifs